Mill Iron is an unincorporated community in Carter County, Montana, United States. The community had its own post office until January 1, 1994.

References

Unincorporated communities in Carter County, Montana
Unincorporated communities in Montana